Uzbekistan–Tajikistan relations refers to the relations between the Republic of Uzbekistan and the Republic of Tajikistan. 

During the presidency of Islam Karimov, analysts said that the two countries are "engaged in an undeclared cold war" and have the worst bilateral relations in Central Asia. However, with the election of Shavkat Mirziyoyev as President of Uzbekistan Uzbek-Tajik relations, as well as relations between Uzbekistan and its neighbors in Central Asia, reached a new era of potential. Practical implementation of this potential is yet to be seen and by 2020 the Central Asian region remains one of the least integrated regions in the world.

Before independence
The Russian Empire (1721–1917) controlled Russian Turkestan as a singular unit; the creation of "nations" within Central Asia was not on the agenda of Russian policy makers. However, revolutionary fervor from the Turkish War of Independence (1919–1923) spilled over from the former Ottoman Empire into Russian lands. Based on the ideology of Pan-Turkism, which seeks to unite all speakers of Turkic languages from Anatolia to China into a single state, the Young Turk leader Enver Pasha lead the Basmachi Revolt in Soviet Central Asia. However, pan-Turkist reformers and Jadids, even members of the anti-Basmachi Communist Party of Turkestan, were hostile to the claim of Tajiks and other non-Turkic peoples to a separate identity in Central Asia.

The establishment of the Uzbek Soviet Socialist Republic (commonly known as Uzbekistan) in 1924 as part of national delimitation in the Soviet Union resulted in the Uzbekization of the Tajik cultural centers of Samarcand and Bukhara, as well as of all Tajiks in Uzbekistan and Tajikistan, since Tajikistan was not afforded the status of its own Soviet Socialist Republic. The ethnogenesis of the "Uzbeks" involved the liquidation of certain other ethnicities like Sarts and Kuramas, who identified with other Iranian peoples like the Tajiks before assimilation into the Uzbek nation. Eventually, however, the Tajik Soviet Socialist Republic (also known as Tajikistan in short) was created in 1929. Turkic, Caucasian, Cossack, and Crimean collaborationism with the Axis powers during World War II resulted in a reaction from Soviet authorities which included population transfers that brought Caucasians to Central Asia.

Both republics participated in the referendum in March 1991 in an attempt to preserve the Soviet Union in a different form, but was soon hampered by the attempted coup in August of that year. As a consequence, both Uzbekistan and Tajikistan declared their independence in the months of 1991 and became members of the Commonwealth of Independent States, in which officially gave way for the dismemberment of the Soviet Union at the end of the year.

1992-1997 Tajikistani civil war
After the Soviet Union fell in 1991, conflicts between both groups emerged when Tajiks attacked Uzbek goods in Tajikistan whilst Uzbeks banned Tajik goods in Uzbekistan. The Civil war in Tajikistan broke out when ethnic groups in Tajikistan began clashing, and they later engaged into a war with devastating casualties. During this war, Uzbek troops entered into Tajikistan to prevent war, but their efforts were futile due to personal disagreements between leaders of both countries. Nevertheless, Uzbekistan received a flood of Uzbek and Tajik refugees from Tajikistan due to the ongoing war, most of whom remained in Uzbekistan after the war.

Energy conflicts

Rogun dam 
Tajikistan had long planned to build what would be the world's largest hydropower dam, the Rogun Dam, on the Vakhsh River. The project was initially proposed by Soviet engineers in the 1950s, but actual construction was postponed by the dissolution of the Soviet Union in 1991. The dam would bring energy independence to Tajikistan, but Uzbekistan argues it would damage its lucrative cotton industry by drying up rivers. In 2012, Uzbekistan president Islam Karimov warned, without naming Tajikistan, that certain dam projects may lead to a regional war in Central Asia.

Gas export to Tajikistan
Tajikistan depends mainly on gas imported from Uzbekistan, and has few other energy sources; as a result, it suffers from chronic electricity shortages. Uzbekistan uses the energy arm to curb Tajikistan in the Rogun Dam dispute. Analysts estimate Tajikistan's gas requirements at 1.2 billion m³/year while in 2012, the country only received one-tenth of this amount at a price of US$300/1000 m³. This quantity has been enough to operate just one Tajik power plant.

Kamchik Pass railway
In 2013, Uzbekistan announced its plan to build a new railway through the Kamchik Pass, connecting the cities of Tashkent and Namangan. The new railway route will replace the old Soviet-era railway that cuts through northern Tajikistan. It would save Uzbekistan a reported $25 million per year in transit fees, and may become part of a long-planned rail route to China. Tajik experts have stated concern that this would potentially further isolate Tajikistan which is already the poorest country in the region. In February 2015, the World Bank announced it would loan $195 million towards the construction of the railway.

Development in relations
With the election of Shavkat Mirziyoyev as President of Uzbekistan (in 2016) Uzbek-Tajik relations, as well as relations between Uzbekistan and its neighbors in Central Asia, reached a new era of potential. Mirziyoyev and Emomali Rahmon have met several times since September 2016, and in March 2018, Mirziyoyev made an historic visit to Dushanbe, where 27 bilateral agreements were signed in the fields of trade, economy, investment, finance, transport and transit, agriculture, water and energy, taxes, customs, tourism, education and science, health, culture, interregional cooperation, in the field of security and countering crime.

State Visits

Presidential visits from Uzbekistan to Tajikistan
 Islam Karimov - (2000)
 Shavkat Mirziyoyev - (March 2018)

Presidential visits from Tajikistan to Uzbekistan
 Emomali Rahmon - (1998)
 Emomali Rahmon - (June 2016)
 Emomali Rahmon - (September 2016)
 Emomali Rahmon - (August 2018)

See also
 Tajikistan-Uzbekistan border
 Tajikistan–Uzbekistan border minefields
 Foreign relations of Uzbekistan
 Foreign relations of Tajikistan

References

 
Tajikistan
Uzbekistan